Miss University of Florida Pageant and the Miss Florida Gator Pageant is the University of Florida's official pageant competition that is part of the larger Miss Florida and Miss America pageants. Florida Blue Key organizes the Miss University of Florida pageant.

Winners

See also
Florida Blue Key

References

External links
 Florida Blue Key Miss University of Florida
 Photos of Miss University of Florida contestants and winners in the University of Florida Archives Photographs Collection, one of the collections in the University of Florida Digital Collections

University of Florida
1950 establishments in Florida
American awards
University of Florida
Awards established in 1950
History of women in Florida